Citizens' Action Party may refer to:

Citizens Action Party (British Columbia)
Citizens' Action Party (Costa Rica)
 Citizens' Action Party (Nicaragua)
Akbayan, or Akbayan Citizens' Action Party, in the Philippines